Events from the year 2017 in Kyrgyzstan

Incumbents
 President – Almazbek Atambayev (until November); Sooronbay Jeenbekov (from 24 November)
 Prime Minister – Sooronbay Jeenbekov (until August); Muhammetkaliy Abulgaziyev (acting 22–26 August); Sapar Isakov (from 26 August)

Events
16 January – a Boeing 747-412F flying the Turkish Airlines Flight 6491 crashed during landing at its scheduled stopover at Manas International Airport in Bishkek. A total of 39 people were killed in the accident.
5 September – Uzbek President Shavkat Mirziyoyev becomes the first Uzbek leader to visit Bishkek in 17 years.
15 October – the 2017 Kyrgyz presidential election. The election was won by Sooronbay Jeenbekov, who was inaugurated as president on 24 November.
24 November – Sooronbay Jeenbekov, took the oath of office as head of state during his inauguration 24 November.

Deaths

16 July – Zhibek Nukeeva, beauty queen, Miss Kyrgyzstan 2013 (b. 1995).

References

 
Years of the 21st century in Kyrgyzstan
Kyrgyzstan
Kyrgyzstan
2010s in Kyrgyzstan